ECAM-EPMI (also École catholique des arts et métiers - EPMI) a French engineering College.

Founded in 1992 by four companies (EDF, Schneider Electric, Philips and PSA) under the name EPMI or École d'électricité, de production et des méthodes industrielles, the school became ECAM-EPMI in 2014.

The school trains industrial engineers with a multidisciplinary profile.

Located in Cergy, as well as in Grasse since 2019, the ECAM-EPMI is a private higher education institution. The school is a member of the CY Cergy Paris University.

References

External links
 ECAM-EPMI

Engineering universities and colleges in France
Grasse
EPMI
Cergy-Pontoise
Educational institutions established in 1992
1992 establishments in France